Anatoly Bulgakov may refer to:

 Anatoly Bulgakov (footballer, born 1944), Russian football coach and former player
 Anatoly Bulgakov (footballer, born 1979), Russian football player